The  is a Japanese railway line in Hokkaido, operated by Hokkaido Railway Company (JR Hokkaido), between Higashi-Kushiro Station in Kushiro and Abashiri Station in Abashiri. In 2008, a dual-mode vehicle was tested on parts of the line.

On 19 November 2016, JR Hokkaido's President announced plans to rationalise its network by up to 1,237 km, or ~50% of the current network, including the proposed conversion of the Senmo Main Line to Third Sector operation, but if local governments are not agreeable, the line will face closure.

Stations

Closed stations 
: since 4 March 2017
: since 14 March 2020
: since 13 March 2021

Service
Nearly all services on the line are Local services, which stop at every station.

History
In 1887 a private 41 km 1067mm gauge line was opened from a sulphur mine at Atsanobori to a refinery at Shibecha, 48 km north of Kushiro. Known as the Kushiro Railway, it closed 9 years later when the sulphur was mined out. 35 years after it closed the 17 km section of the Senmo line between Mashu - Shibecha was built on the formation of the Kushiro Railway.

Construction of the Senmo line started from both Asashiri and Kushiro, with the northern portion opening to Satsutsuru in sections between 1924 and 1929, and the southern portion opening in sections to Kawayu between 1927 and 1930. The Satsutsuru - Kawayu section opened in 1931, completing the line.

Freight services on the line ceased in 2002.

Former connecting lines

 Abashiri Station - The Yumo Line to Nakayubetsu opened in sections between 1935 & 1952 and closed in 1987.
 Mokoto Station - A  gauge line operated to Yamazono (25 km) from 1935 to 1965. A 7 km branch line to Toyo Sawa operated from 1949 to 1962.
 Hamakoshimizu Station - Another  gauge line extended 18 km east to service the sugar beet industry between 1941 and 1953.
 Yamubetsu Station - A  private railway operated to Koshimizu (9 km) from 1930 to 1939.
 Shari Station - In 1938, fears of Russian naval activity resulted in the decision to build a line to Shibubetsu through the Konpokutoge Pass for defence purposes. Construction was suspended in 1941 following the Soviet–Japanese Neutrality Pact. Construction recommenced in 1957 to service forestry activity, but was suspended again when the highway was upgraded. The line was opened 12.8 km to Koshikawa, servicing the local community until closure in 1970. A substantial brick arch bridge was built south of Koshikawa before construction was abandoned.
 Shibecha Station;
- A 39 km  gauge line opened to Nakashibetsu in 1932. In 1936 it was replaced by a  line, which was extended 40 km to Shibetsu, operating until 1989. A branch from Nakashibetsu connected to the Nemuro Main Line at Attoko between 1933 and 1989, the two branches being known collectively as the Shibetsu Line. A total of 9 separate  gauge development lines connected to stations along the Shibetsu Line were built between 1930 and 1963, the last closing in 1971.

- Another  gauge system connected the Numahoro District to Shibecha, consisting of a 23 km 'main line' opened 1955, and a 6 km branch opened 1966. Both closed in 1971.

See also
List of railway lines in Japan

References

External links

 JR Hokkaido official website 
 JR Hokkaido official website 

Rail transport in Hokkaido
Lines of Hokkaido Railway Company
1067 mm gauge railways in Japan
Dual-mode vehicle